Beyond the Horizon is a 2005 Burmese drama film directed by San Shwe Maung. In this film, Htun Eaindra Bo won her third Academy Award for Best Actress and Naing Nu Shain (aka) Pha Hti got Academy Award for Best Cinematography.

Plot
The film tells the story of a man whose dreams are premonitions of the future.

The protagonist is psychologically disturbed by recurring nightmares. Something is adrift in a river inlet, drawing ever closer to him. To seek solace he approaches a psychiatrist and for a short while is freed from nightmares till he meets a woman and falls in love.

Cast
Lwin Moe
Yan Kyaw
Htun Eaindra Bo
Khine Thin Kyi
Myat Kay Thi Aung

International showing
In 2005, this film was released in Myanmar.
On August 7–13, 2006, this film was screened at the ASEAN Film Festival in Singapore.

References

2005 drama films
2005 films
2000s Burmese-language films
Burmese drama films